Knighthawk Air Express Ltd. was a cargo airline based in Canada, which operated primarily within Canada, from hubs located in Calgary, the westernmost base, Ottawa, and Montreal. It operated cargo services on behalf of express package services including Purolator, Airborne Express and FedEx.

History 

The airline was established in December 1993. In October 2003, it filed for bankruptcy. In June 2004, Knighthawk Air restarted operations. 

On May 16, 2005, Knighthawk Air Express received a cancellation notice for both of its routes effective from May 28, 2005. The airline immediately took steps to reduce operating costs and distribute assets.

Accidents and incidents
30 December 1998 – Knighthawk Air Express Dassault Falcon 20D, on a cargo flight from Gander, was on approach to St John's when it encountered severe turbulence and wind shear, resulting in loss of altitude and impact with trees. The aircraft was able to land at the airport but sustained substantial damage to the left wing. There were no injuries to the two-person crew.

Fleet 

When operations ceased, the Knighthawk Air Express fleet consisted of the following aircraft:
4 Dassault Falcon 20
1 Beechcraft 1900
2 Beechcraft Model 99

References

Defunct airlines of Canada
Airlines established in 1993
Airlines disestablished in 2005